In modern Sanskrit literature, "Mātrigītikāñjalih" is a kavya written by Harekrishna Meher, comprising 25 Sanskrit songs on different topics and tastes experienced in human life. The titles of the songs indicate their themes. The compositions in the kavya feature alliteration, Upama, Rupaka and other figures of speech.

List of songs
 The first song "Vani-Gitika" (Kavi-Janani Tvam) depicts a prayer to Sarasvati, the Goddess of speech, learning and music, to dispel ignorance and spread wisdom. 
 "Matri-Gitika" (Jayatu Janani) is a patriotic song describing the civilization, natural beauty, cultural harmony, philanthropic attitude and other positive aspects of India. The title of the kavya is taken from the name of this song.
 "Visva-Gitika" (Bhagavan Visva-Pavana He) portrays the greatness and divine excellence of Supreme Being. 
 "Jivana-Gitika" (Jivanam Sundaram) elucidates the brighter aspects of human life. 
 In "Purushottama-Gitika" (Pranamami Tam), Lord Jagannath of Puri is prayed to with reverence and devotion. 
 "Prabodha-Gitika" (Manava Re) is addressed to the human being for self-awareness and self-realisation. 
 "Nari-Gitika" (Sa Nari Nirupama) presents various facets of the dignity and divine power of women. 
 "Pranayini-Gitika" (Lila Aham), Song of the Beloved Maiden, is the first of two love-lyrics.
 The second of the two love-lyrics is "Pranayi-Gitika" (Lila Tvam), Song of the Lover. 
 "Vibhu-Gitika" (Divyati Bhavato) is dedicated to the omnipresence of Almighty God. 
 In "Sisu-Gitika" (Pasya Bhasvaram), the comeliness of God's creation is observed in the limbs of the delicate baby.
 "Nataraja-Gitika" (Tryambakam Yajamahe) forms a prayer to Lord Shiva, the Supreme Dancer. 
 "Sakti-Gitika" (Jaya Jaya Durge) forms a devotional prayer with invocation to Goddess of Power. 
 The greatness of time, the all-devouring factor of the universe, is presented in "Samaya-Gitika" (Samaya Namaste). 
 "Kalakara-Gitika" (Kalakara He) is addressed to the Moon, as the source of all sweet and subtle arts. 
 In "Abhijnana-Gitika" (Kathayati Ko Va), the philosophical notions of Advaita Vedanta are deliberated upon in view of self-consciousness. 
 "Siva-Sankalpa-Gitika" (Mano Bhavatu) investigates the thinking power of the subtle and atomic mind from a philosophical perspective. 
 A synthesis of the spiritual and scientific conceptions of Gayatri, the Power of God Savitr is depicted in "Gayatri-Gitika".  
 The Sanskrit language, literature and tradition are elucidated in "Bharata-Bharati-Gitika".
 Features of subtle thinking and the transcendental vision of the poet are portrayed in "Kavi-Gitika" (Amara-Kavis Tvam). 
 The glory of the Divine Song Srimad-Bhagavad-Gita is maintained in "Gita-Gitika".
 "Sangita-Gitika" (Vidhatuh Pranganam Vitatam Sangitamayam) reveals that all the creation of the Creator is replete with music. Every aspect of nature and animals all have musical rhythm from birth till death. 
 In "Dasarupa-Gitika", ten incarnations of God are praised with divine excellence. 
 "Nava-Varsha-Gitika" (Subham Bhavatu Navavarsham) depicts hearty compliments, noble thinking with good deeds, blessings of nature, a pollution-free environment, prosperity, peace and happiness in the world. 
 The last song "Desha-Gitika" describes natural wealth, cultural heritage, national unity and the universal fraternity of India.

See also
 Philosophical Reflections in the Naisadhacarita

References
 ‘Mātrigītikāñjalih’
Original Sanskrit Gitikavya with English Translation by Dr. Harekrishna Meher ( मातृगीतिकाञ्जलिः /  हरेकृष्ण-मेहेरः ) Published by : Kalahandi Lekhak Kala Parishad, Bhawanipatna, Orissa, India in the year 1997.
 Review on Sanskrit Kavya “Matrigitikanjalih”. Reviewer : Dr. Naba Kishore Mishra, published in : “Bartika”, April–June 1999,Page 501-508. By : Saraswat Sahitya Sanskrutika Parishad, Dasharathpur, Jajpur, Orissa.
 Sanskrit Review on “Matrigitikanjalih” Kavya. Reviewer : Dr. Suil Kumar Pradhan, published in : “Aranyakam”, September 1999, Page 29-30. By :Sanskrit Prasar Parishad, Maruti Mandir, Prakashpuri, Arrah, Bihar.
 Review on “Matrigitikanjalih”, Reviewer : Dr. Harsh Dev Madhav, published in :“Drik”,Vol. 5, Jan-June 2001, Page 112-113. By : Drig-Bharati, Yojana–3, Jhusi, Allahabad.
 Sanskrit Article “Matrigitikanjalih – Adhunika-Gitikavyam” By : Dr. Harsh Dev Madhav, in pp. 56–57 of his Sanskrit Book “Nakha-Darpanah” (Modern Criticism of Contemporary Sanskrit Literature), Published by : Vani Akademi, Chandkheda, Gujarat, 2008.
 Comments of litterateurs and critics on Sanskrit Giti-kavya 'Matrigitikanjalih' of Harekrishna Meher, under the heading : 'Mitam cha Saaram cha', published in :'Drik', Vol.17, Jan.-June 2007, pp. 129–131. Drig-Bharati, Jhusi, Allahabad, Uttar Pradesh.
 Musical Notation (Swara-Lipi) of Sanskrit Lyric “Nava-Varsha Gitika” (Subham Bhavatu Nava Varsham) from Matrigitikanjalih-Kavya. Music composed by : Pandit H.Harendra Joshi, Ratlam, Madhya Pradesh. Published in :'Sangeet', December 1999, Page 13-20. By :Sangeet Karyalaya, Hathras, Uttar Pradesh.
 Original Sanskrit Poems of “Matrigitikanjalih” (Desha-Gitika, Jeevana-Gitika, Sangeeta-Gitika,Vani-Gitika and Navavarsha-Gitika) with life-sketch of poet Harekrishna Meher included in the book “Vimsha-Shatabdi-Sanskrita-Kavyamritam” (National Level Biggest Anthology of Sanskrit Poetry Representing Twentieth Century) Vol.-1, 2000, pp. 821–829.
Compiled & Edited by: Prof. Dr. Abhiraj Rajendra Mishra,
Published by : Delhi Sanskrit Akademi, Jhandewalan, Karolbag, New Delhi- 110005.
 ‘Matrigitikanjalih’ Kavya with its author has been referred to and discussed in the article “Arvacheena-Sanskrita-Sahitya-Sarvekshanam (1997-98)"     By : Dr. Ramakanta Shukla in ‘Arvacheena Sanskritam’, Vol-24/4, Oct. 2002, Page 27 & 42, Published by : Devavani Parishad, Delhi, 6/Vani Vihar, New Delhi- 110059.
‘Jeevana-Gitika’ of 'Matrigitikanjalih' Kavya with its author has been referred to and discussed in the article : “Adhunik Sanskrit Kavyon Ki Drishti Mein Jeevan” By : Dr. Sweta Prajapati in “Drik”, Vol-9, Jan-June 2003, page- 80. Published by : Drig Bharati, 1/32,MIG Avas Vikas Colony,Yojana-3, Jhusi, Allahabad - 211019, Uttar Pradesh.

Research works where "Matrigitikanjalih" Giti-Kavya and its author
Harekrishna Meher have been referred and discussed :

 “Adhunik Sanskrit Gitikavya Ka Vikas” (1960 se 1989 tak) By : Dr. Sanat Kumar Dubey (Research Guide : Dr. Bal Shastri) Ph.D. Thesis of Sanskrit Deptt in the Year 1992, Sagar University, Sagar, Madhya Pradesh, India.
 “Sanskrit Lyrics of Orissa in 20th Century” By : Dr. Sudarshan Panda (Research Guide : Dr. Raghunath Panda) Ph.D. Thesis of Sanskrit Deptt in 1997, Utkal University, Bhubaneswar, Orissa, India.

Sources 
 http://marketime.blogspot.com/2008/07/among-modern-sanskrit-lyricists.html (Modern Sanskrit Lyricist).
 https://books.google.com/books?id=A_JjAAAAMAAJ&q=harekrishna+meher&dq=harekrishna+meher&pgis=1 (University of Michigan)
 https://books.google.com/books?id=0vZ3AAAAIAAJ&dq=editions:0hM4hvuyBIuyK4&pgis=1 (University of California)
 https://web.archive.org/web/20101226213435/http://www.museindia.com/focuscontent.asp?issid=34&id=2292  (Tapasvini of Gangadhara Meher)

Sanskrit literature